Heilmann & Littmann was a leading German contracting business.

It was founded in 1871 by Jakob Heilmann (1846-1927) in Regensburg as "Baugeschäft J. Heilmann" (J. Heilmann building company), and, by 1876, specialized on railway construction, later on in building construction.

In 1892, the architect Max Littmann (1862-1931), Heilmann's son-in-law, joined the company, thus forming an ordinary partnership ("Offene Handelsgesellschaft Heilmann & Littmann").

In 1897, Richard Reverdy became another partner and managing director, and the company was transformed into a limited liability company, specialising on the construction of theaters and other monumental structure, e.g. the present-day Munich Hofbräuhaus was erected during the years 1896 and 1897 by Heilmann & Littmann.

After Jakob Heilmann's death in 1927, the construction businesses in Munich, Nuremberg and Berlin were taken over by the Heilmann'sche Immobilien-Gesellschaft AG, creating the Heilmann & Littmann Bau-AG. 
After a merger in 1980 with the Sager & Woerner KG the company's name changed into Heilit + Woerner Bau-AG, and eventually it was taken over by the Walter Bau AG Augsburg.

External links
 

Construction and civil engineering companies of Germany
Defunct companies of Germany
German companies established in 1871
Construction and civil engineering companies established in 1871